The Goose Girl is a 1915 American silent drama film directed by Frederick A. Thomson and distributed by Paramount Pictures. The film is based on the 1909 novel of the same name by Harold McGrath and starred Marguerite Clark and Monroe Salisbury.

Cast 

 Marguerite Clark - Gretchen
 Monroe Salisbury - King Frederick
 Sydney Deane - Prince Regent of Jugendheit
 E. N. Dunbar - Grand Duke of Ehrenstein
 James Neill - Count Von Herbeck
 Lawrence Peyton - Von Wallenstein
 P. E. Peters - Carmichael
 H. B. Carpenter - Torpete The Gypsy
 Ernest Joy - Hans
 J. M. Casidy - Gottfried
 Miss Johnson - Princess Hildegarde
 Jane Darwell - Irma

Plot 
Count Von Herbeck (Neill), an ambitious chancellor to the Grand Duke of Ehrenstein (Dunbar), secretly marries and has a daughter. At the urging of his dying wife, the count kidnaps the duke's infant daughter (Clark) and substitutes his own in the castle so that she may live in the style of a great lady.

The real princess, abandoned by the gypsies who abducted her for the count, is raised by peasants and given the name "Goose Girl." The young King Frederick (Salisbury) is betrothed to the impostor princess of Ehrenstein, whom he has never seen, but before the wedding takes place, he runs away and roams the countryside, where he encounters and falls in love with the Goose Girl.

After a series of adventures, during which Frederick decides to wed the false princess for the good of the country, the Goose Girl's true identity is revealed, and Frederick is delighted to learn that he is now betrothed to the girl of his heart.

Preservation status 
This is now considered a lost film.

See also 
 List of lost films

References

External links 

 
 
 The Goose Girl still photo session at SilentHollywood.com

1915 films
1915 drama films
Silent American drama films
American silent feature films
American black-and-white films
Films based on American novels
Lost American films
Paramount Pictures films
Films set in Europe
1915 lost films
Lost drama films
Films directed by Frederick A. Thomson
1910s American films
1910s English-language films